The European and Mediterranean Plant Protection Organization (EPPO) is an intergovernmental organisation responsible for European cooperation in plant protection in the European and Mediterranean region. Founded on April 18th, 1951 and based in Paris, France, EPPO is the Regional Plant Protection Organization (RPPO) for Europe under the International Plant Protection Convention (IPPC).

To meet its objectives to protect plants, strategize against the introduction and spread of dangerous pests, and to promote safe and effective control methods, EPPO develops international standards and recommendations, provides reporting services, participates in global discussions on plant health, EPPO hold regular expert working groups, and maintained EPPO codes.

History 
Founded in 1951 and based in Paris, France, EPPO is the Regional Plant Protection Organization (RPPO) for Europe under the International Plant Protection Convention (IPPC). The intergovernmental organisation responsible for European cooperation in plant protection in the European and Mediterranean region had grown to 52 member states . EPPO's objectives are to protect plants, to develop international strategies against the introduction and spread of dangerous pests, and to promote safe and effective control methods.

EPPO has developed international standards and recommendations on phytosanitary measures, good plant protection practice, and on the assessment of plant protection products (pesticides). It also provides a reporting service of events of phytosanitary concern such as outbreaks and new pest records. EPPO maintain datasheets on pests of regulatory concern. As a Regional Plant Protection Organization, EPPO also participates in global discussions on plant health organised by FAO and the IPPC Secretariat. EPPO holds expert working groups to perform pest risk analyses on plant pests of concern to the EPPO region.

EPPO codes 

EPPO is responsible for management of the EPPO code system, previously known as Bayer codes. The system is an encoded identifier used by EPPO, in a system designed to uniquely identify organisms that are important to agriculture and crop protection.

EPPO member countries 
:

 (PPIS)

EPPO Bulletin
The EPPO Bulletin is the official publication of EPPO. It features articles on all aspects of plant protection and is published on behalf of EPPO by Wiley-Blackwell. Articles are published in French or English with a Russian summary.

References

Brunel S, Suffert M, Petter F, Baker R (2013) Interface between pest risk science and policy: the EPPO perspective. NeoBiota 18: 9-23. https://doi.org/10.3897/neobiota.18.4049

Brunel S, Petter F, Fernandez-Galiano E, Smith I (2009) Approach of the European and Mediterranean Plant Protection Organization to the Evaluation and Management of Risks Presented by Invasive Alien Plants. In: Inderjit (eds) Management of Invasive Weeds. Invading Nature – Springer Series In Invasion Ecology, vol 5. Springer, Dordrecht. https://doi.org/10.1007/978-1-4020-9202-2_16

CABI/EPPO (1992/1997) Quarantine Pests for Europe (1st and 2nd edition). CABI, Wallingford (GB).

EPPO (2020) Revision of the EPPO datasheets: From static documents to dynamic datasheets. EPPO Bulletin 50(3), 528-528. https://doi.org/10.1111/epp.12731

EPPO (2020) Annual Report and Council Recommendations 2019. EPPO Bulletin 50(3), 578-594. https://doi.org/10.1111/epp.12714

Giovani B, Blümel S, Lopian R, Teulon D, Bloem S, Galeano Martinez C, Beltran Montoya C, Urias Morales CR, Dharmapuri S, Timote V, Horn N (2020) Science diplomacy for plant health. Nature Plants 6(8), 902-905. https://doi.org/10.1038/s41477-020-0744-x

Mathys (1977) Significance of the European and Mediterranean Plant Protection Organization, its functions and their implementation. Pesticide Management and Insecticide Resistance 1977, Pages 477-488. https://doi.org/10.1016/B978-0-12-738650-8.50038-2

Pautasso M, Petter F, Rortais A, Roy AS (2015) Emerging risks to plant health: a European perspective. CAB Reviews 2015 10, No. 021. doi: 10.1079/PAVSNNR201510021

External links
 EPPO website
 EPPO Global Database
 EPPO Bulletin
 EPPO Platform on Pest Risk Analysis
 EPPO database on Diagnostic Expertise
 EPPO-Q-bank
 
 
 
 
 - for DNA reference sequences of quarantine pests

Agricultural organizations based in France
Agriculture in Europe
Food and Agriculture Organization
Environmental organizations based in France
Organizations established in 1951
Pesticide organizations
1951 establishments in France
Phytosanitary authorities